This is a demography of the population of Bermuda including population density, ethnicity, education level, health of the populace, economic status, religious affiliations and other aspects of the population, including changes in the demographic make-up of Bermuda over the centuries of its permanent settlement.

History

From settlement until the nineteenth century, the largest demographic group remained what in the United States is referred to as white-Anglo (or white Anglo-Saxon Protestant). The reason Black slaves did not quickly come to outnumber Whites, as was the case in continental and West Indian colonies at that time (such as Carolina Colony and Barbados), was that Bermuda's seventeenth century agricultural industry continued to rely on indentured servants, mostly from England, until 1684, thanks to it remaining a company colony (with poor would-be settlers contracting to provide a fixed number of years' labour in exchange for the cost of transport). Spanish-speaking Blacks began to immigrate in numbers from the West Indies as indentured servants in the mid-seventeenth century, but White fears at their growing numbers led to their terms of indenture being raised from seven years, as with Whites, to 99 years. Throughout the next two centuries, frequent efforts were made to lower the Black population.

Free Blacks, who were the majority of Black Bermudians in the seventeenth century, were threatened with enslavement as an attempt to encourage their emigration, and slave owners were encouraged to export enslaved Blacks (with all slaves seen, like horses on an archipelago with dense forests and few roads, as a status symbol) whenever a war loomed, as they were portrayed as unnecessary bellies to feed during times of shortage (even before abandoning agriculture for maritime activities in 1684, Bermuda had become reliant on food imports).

In addition to free and slaved Blacks, seventeenth century Bermuda had large minorities of Irish indentured servants and Native American slaves, as well as smaller number of Scots, all forced to leave their homelands and shipped to Bermuda. Native Americans sold into chattel slavery in Bermuda were brought from various parts of North America, including Mexico, but most particularly from the Algonquian areas of the Atlantic seaboard, from which natives were subjected to genocide by the English; most famously following the Pequot War and Metacomet's War. The Irish and Scots are usually described as prisoners-of-war, which was certainly true of the Scots. The Irish shipped to Bermuda following the Cromwellian conquest of Ireland included both prisoners-of-war and civilians of either sex ethnically cleansed from lands slated for resettlement by Protestants from Britain, including Cromwell's soldiers who were to be paid with Irish land. In Bermuda they were sold into indentured servitude. The Scots and the Irish were ostracised by the white English population, who were particularly fearful of the Irish, who plotted rebellions with Black slaves, and intermarried with the Blacks and Native Americans. The majority white-Anglo population, or at least its elites, became alarmed very early at the increasing numbers of Irish and non-whites, most of whom were presumed to be clinging to Catholicism (recusancy was a crime in Bermuda, as it was in England).

Despite the banning of the importation of any more Irish after they were perceived to be the leaders of a foiled 1661 uprising intended to be carried out in concert with black slaves, the passing of a law against miscegenation in 1663, the first of a succession of attempts to force free blacks to emigrate in 1656 (in response to an uprising by enslaved blacks), and frequent encouragement of the owners of black slaves to export them, by the eighteenth century the merging of the various minority groups, along with some of the white-Anglos, had resulted in a new demographic group, "coloured" (which term, in Bermuda, referred to anyone not wholly of European ancestry) Bermudians, who gained a slight majority by the nineteenth century.

Some islanders, especially in St David's, still trace their ancestry to Native Americans, and many more are ignorant of having such ancestry. Hundreds of Native Americans were shipped to Bermuda. The best-known examples were the Algonquian peoples, who were exiled from the New England colonies and sold into slavery in the seventeenth century, notably in the aftermaths of the Pequot War and King Philip's War, but some are believed to have been brought from as far away as Mexico.

During the course of the eighteenth century, Bermuda's population was boiled down to two demographic groups: White and Coloured.

The population of Bermuda on the 1 January 1699 was 5,862, including 3,615 white (with 724 men able to bear arms) and 2,247 coloured (with 529 men able to bear arms).

The population of Bermuda on 17 April 1721, was listed as 8,364, composed of: "Totals:—Men on the Muster roll, 1,078; men otherwise, 91; Women, 1,596; boys, 1,072; girls, 1,013. Blacks; Men, 817, women 965; boys 880; girls, 852."

The population of Bermuda in 1727 was 8,347, and included 4,470 white (910 men; 1,261 boys; 1,168 women; 1,131 girls) and 3,877 coloured (787 men; 1,158 boys; 945 women; 987 girls).

The population of Bermuda in 1783 was 10,381, and included 5,462 white (1,076 males under 15; 1,325 males over 15; 3,061 females) and 4,919 coloured (1,153 males under 15; 1,193 males over 15; 2,573 females).

By 18 November 1811, the permanent population of Bermuda was 10,180, including 5,425 coloured and 4,755 white:

By 1831, the permanent population of Bermuda (not including the thousands of Royal Navy sailors and marines or British Army and Board of Ordnance soldiers based in Bermuda, or the 1,500 convicts shipped from Britain and Ireland to labour at the Royal Naval Dockyard) was 11,250, including 7,330 white and free coloured, and 3,920 enslaved (coloured).

The term coloured was generally used in preference to black, with anyone who was of wholly European ancestry (at least Northern European) defined as white, leaving everyone else as coloured. This included the multi-racial descendants of the previous minority demographic groups (Black, Irish and Native American) that had quickly blended together, along with some part of the White Anglo-Saxon Protestant majority, as well as the occasional Jew, Persian, East Asian or other non-White and non-Black Bermudian.

It was largely by this method (mixed-race Bermudians being added to the number of Blacks, rather than added to the number of Whites or being defined as a separate demographic group) that Coloured (subsequently redefined after the Second World War as Black) Bermudians came to outnumber White Bermudians by the end of the eighteenth century, despite starting off at a numerical disadvantage, and despite low Black immigration prior to the latter nineteenth century. The scale of White relative to Black emigration in the seventeenth and eighteenth centuries also doubtless played a factor. Roughly 10,000 Bermudians are estimated to have emigrated, primarily to the North American continental colonies (particularly: Virginia; Carolina Colony, which later became South Carolina and North Carolina; Georgia; and Florida) before United States independence in 1783. This included white Bermudians from every level of society, but particularly poorer, landless ones as Bermuda's high birth rate produced population growth that could not be sustained without emigration. Many free black Bermudians also emigrated, but this was less likely to be voluntary given that they would be leaving families behind and generally faced poorer prospects outside of Bermuda (although white fear of the growing number of blacks did result in free blacks being coerced to emigrate, though how many did is not recorded).

Enslaved black Bermudians, by comparison, had little choice but to go were they were taken, and more affluent white Bermudians who settled on the continent or elsewhere often brought slaves with them, as was the case with Denmark Vesey (born in the West Indies, who was enslaved for years to a Bermudian who then resettled with him in South Carolina). Given the choice, enslaved black Bermudians consequently generally chose not to emigrate, even when it would have meant freedom. Abandoning their families in Bermuda was too great a step. Enslaved adult black Bermudian men, like white Bermudian men, were generally sailors and or shipwrights, and hired themselves out as did free men, or were hired out, with their earnings usually divided between themselves and the slave masters, who used the enslaved man's family bonds to Bermuda to control him; allowing slaves to carry out a small degree of control over their economic life and to accumulate meager savings also worked to discourage slaves from escaping overseas, where they might find freedom, but also likely face poverty and social exclusion.

By example, in 1828 the ship Lavinia stopped in Bermuda on a voyage from Trinidad to Belfast, Ireland, and signed on twelve enslaved Bermudian sailors as crew. On reaching Belfast, where slavery was illegal, in September, eleven of the enslaved Bermudians were brought before a magistrate with members of the Anti-Slavery Society in attendance after a member of the Society of Friends had reported their presence (the twelfth, Thomas Albouy, failed to appear as he was on watch duty aboard the Lavinia and unwilling to abandon his post). Each man was asked individually whether he wished to remain in Ireland as a free man. Their replies were:
 Benjamin Alick (written Alik): "I wish to go back to my family and friends"
 Richard Place: "I wish to return to my mother"
 Francis Ramio: "I wish to return to my wife"
 Joseph Varman: wished to return
 James Lambert: wished to return
 Thomas Williams: wished to return to his wife and child
 Joshua Edwards: wished to remain free in Ireland
 Robert Edwards: wished to remain free in Ireland
 Joseph Rollin: wished to remain free in Ireland
 John Stowe (written Stow): "I wish to go back to my family"
 George Bassett: "I am much obliged to the gentlemen for their offer of freedom, but I wish to return to my friends"

The Royal Gazette, on 13 December 1926, quoted a contemporary Irish newspaper as having described the enslaved Bermudians as they spoke English very well, and were stout, healthy men, clean and well dressed. They told the magistrate that in Bermuda their employment was not arduous, they did very little work on the Sabbath day, and they all attended a place of worship. They were usually hired out by their masters, who got two-thirds of their wage and they got the other third. They knew before they left Bermuda that they might be freed in Great Britain, but they had no complaint to make of their condition and, when they spoke of returning to their families, they indicated "the finest emotions and susceptibilities of affection".

Other contributing factors to the changing ratio of the coloured to white population during the seventeenth and eighteenth centuries included the greater mortality of Whites from disease in the late seventeenth century, and patriarchal property laws that transferred a woman's property to her husband upon her marriage. This, combined with the shortage of white males due to the steady outflow of marriageable white sailors from Bermuda who settled abroad or were lost at sea, resulted in a sizeable contingent of ageing and childless white spinsters for which Bermuda was noted well into the twentieth century.

Considerable written material (letters, official reports, petitions, et cetera, and, from 1783, the content of Bermudian newspapers) that survives in archives and museums gives insight into the social, economic and political life of Bermuda between its settlement in the seventeenth century and the mid-nineteenth century. Most of the Bermudians mentioned by name in these documents, however, tend to have been the more prominent white males. The views expressed about Bermudians, certainly in official correspondence from governors, naval and military officers, and other representatives of the imperial government, were often negative, resulting from the antagonistic relationship with Bermuda's native elites, whose economic interests often were not aligned with imperial interests (this was not necessarily always the case for poorer whites and free or enslaved coloured Bermudians). After the American War of Independence, there was deep distrust of Bermuda's local government and the merchant class that dominated it due to the prominent Bermudians who had schemed with the continental rebels, supplying them with ships and gunpowder, and continuing to trade with them in violation of the law. Although it was observed that enslaved coloured Bermudians were generally less likely to revolt than slaves in other colonies, the experience of various slave revolts in other British colonies during the preceding decades and the then ongoing uprising of slaves in Saint Domingue (now Haiti) during the French Revolution, the facts of which it was believed that well-travelled enslaved Bermudian sailors were particularly well-acquainted with and would be inspired by, combined with the relative freedom of movement and association of Bermuda's slaves, meant they were seen as a potential threat by officers of the British Government. As it was also perceived that slaves were not vital to the colony as slave-ownership was common among less well-to-do white households in which much of the work performed by slaves should, and elsewhere would, have been carried out by the more common class of whites themselves (this may have been true of household slaves, who acted as servants and tended small adjacent plots of vegetables grown for the subsistence of the household, which was virtually the only agriculture carried out in Bermuda between 1684 and the 1840s, but most able-bodied enslaved men were actually engaged in maritime activities that were essential to Bermuda's economic survival), it was also felt that the threat of a slave revolt was an unnecessary one.

This was not the only instance where the assumptions of officers of the British government, who were usually aristocrats or from the most privileged class of commoners, coloured their views of Bermudians and Bermudian society. A frequent comment made of Bermudians in the late eighteenth and early nineteenth century was that they were lazy or indolent. Most frequently cited in evidence of this was the apparent failure of Bermudians to fell the cedar forest cloaking the archipelago in order to adopt any manner of intensive agriculture. Numerous governors attempted to encourage agriculture, with little success due partly to the stigma in Bermuda against working the land. What was not obvious to many outside observers was Bermuda's shortage of wood, specifically Bermuda cedar, upon which its maritime economy relied. Bermuda's shipbuilders struggled not to exhaust this precious resource, and land-owning Bermudians counted cedars on their property as wealth which accrued interest over decades as the trees grew, and the remaining forest was consequently protected.

The voices of Bermudians themselves, at least of the poorer ones, the enslaved, and the women, were not generally recorded in the documents that were handed down by those generations.

Bermuda was a popular subject for playwrights, authors and poets in England during the early years of its colonisation, given the drama of its unintended settlement through the wreck of the Sea Venture and its being by far the more successful of the Virginia Company's two settlements until the 1620s. However, as Virginia developed and new colonies were established in the West Indies, Bermuda slipped from the view of writers and the public in England (nearly a century after its settlement, Bermuda, along with the rest of the Kingdom of England, united with the Kingdom of Scotland to become the Kingdom of Great Britain). Although rarely mentioned in histories or other reference books between the latter seventeenth century and the nineteenth century, Bermuda's designation as an Imperial fortress, Britain's primary naval and military base in the region of North America and the West Indies following US independence, and the emergence of the tourism industry in the latter nineteenth century, brought many erudite visitors and short-term residents, some already published authors, and more comprehensive ethnographic information on the people of Bermuda was included in many subsequently published recollections, travel guides, and magazine articles, such as the book BERMUDA; A COLONY, A FORTRESS AND A PRISON; OR, Eighteen Months in the Somers Islands, published anonymously (the author, Ferdinand Whittingham, was identified only as A FIELD OFFICER who had served in the Bermuda Garrison) in 1857, though the authors' observations often gave more reliable insight into the assumptions and nature of their own societies and classes.

In 1828, Purser Richard Otter of the Royal Navy published Sketches of Bermuda, or Somers' Islands, a description of Bermuda based on his own observations while serving there, assigned to the North America and West Indies Station. Of his reasons for writing the account, he wrote in the preface:

Of Bermuda's importance to the British Empire, he observed:

Of the prevailing opinion of Bermudians as expressed by other Imperial government officials who had served there, and of his own opinion of Bermudians, he wrote:

The rich history of Bermudians and Bermuda, and the important roles they had played in almost every Imperial endeavour of England and Britain in the Americas and beyond during the seventeenth and eighteenth centuries, eluded Otter, who briefly summarised the first few years of settlement before recording:

And:

On the subject of contemporary Bermudians, he wrote:

He also wrote at length about the industry, economy and subsistence strategies of Bermuda, showing the usual attitude of Imperial officials to Bermudians perceived failure to clear forest to turn land over to commercial agriculture:

Susette Harriet Lloyd travelled to Bermuda in company with the Church of England's Archdeacon of Bermuda Aubrey Spencer, Mrs Spencer, and Ella, Miss Parker, Major and Mrs Hutchison and their daughter, the Reverend Robert Whitehead, Lieutenant Thompson of the 74th Regiment of Foot, and Lieutenant Young, aboard , which was delivering a military detachment from England to the Bermuda Garrison. Lloyd's visit to Bermuda lasted two years, and her ‘’Sketches of Bermuda’’ (a collection of letters she had written en route to, and during her stay in, Bermuda, and dedicated to Archdeacon Spencer) was published in 1835, immediately following the abolition of slavery in Bermuda and the remainder of the British Empire in 1834 (Bermuda elected to end slavery immediately, becoming the first colony to do so, though all other British colonies except for Antigua availed themselves of an allowance made by the Imperial government enabling them to phase slavery out gradually). Lloyd's book gives a rare contemporary account of Bermudian society immediately prior to the abolition of slavery.

Of white Bermudians, her observations included:

She devoted more attention to the subject of black Bermudians, writing:

Lloyd's negative comments on the dissenters reflected the Church of England's belated attempts to counter the inroads made by Methodists with coloured Bermudians. Although the Church of England is the established church, and as such was the only church originally permitted to operate in Bermuda, Presbyterians were permitted to have separate churches and to conduct their own services during the eighteenth century, and Methodists were permitted worship in the nineteenth century, despite initial steps taken by the Government to prevent this. The Wesleyan Methodists sought to include enslaved blacks resulting in 1800 in the passage of a law by the Parliament of Bermuda barring any but Church of England and Presbyterian ministers from preaching. In December, 1800, the Methodist Reverend John Stephenson was incarcerated for six months for preaching to slaves. The Methodists also promoted education of slaves. The Church of England had generally been unwelcoming to slaves, and was never able to catch up to the Methodist's lead. In 1869, the African Methodist Episcopal Church was launched in Bermuda, and today the Anglican Church of Bermuda (as the Church of England in Bermuda was re-titled in 1978), though the largest denomination, has a disproportionately white membership. Stephenson was followed in 1808 by the Reverend Joshua Marsden. There were 136 members of the Society when Marsden left Bermuda in 1812. The Methodists were permitted to conduct baptisms and weddings, but not funerals for some time (the only civil cemeteries in Bermuda prior to the twentieth century having all been attached to the churchyards of the nine Church of England parish churches and the Presbyterian Christ Church in Warwick), which were the remit of the established church.

The foundation stone of a Wesleyan Methodist Chapel was laid in St. George's Town on the 8 June 1840, the local Society (by then numbering 37 class leaders, 489 Members, and 20 other communicants) having previously occupied a small, increasingly decrepit building that had been damaged beyond use in a storm in 1839. The inscription on the foundation stone included: Mr. James Dawson is the gratuitous Architect; Mr. Robert Lavis Brown, the Overseer. The Lot of Land on which the Chapel is built was purchased, April 24, 1839, from Miss Caroline Lewis, for Two hundred and fifty pounds currency. The names of the Trustees are, William Arthur Outerbridge, William Gibbons, Thomas Stowe Tuzo, Alfred Tucker Deane, James Richardson, Thomas Richardson, John Stephens, Samuel Rankin Higgs, Robert Lavis Brown, James Andrew Durnford, Thomas Argent Smith, John P. Outerbridge, and Benjamin Burchall. The African Methodist Episcopal Church (AME) First District website records that in the autumn of 1869, three farsighted Christian men—Benjamin Burchall of St. George's, William B. Jennings of Devonshire and Charles Roach Ratteray of Somerset—set in motion the wheels that brought African Methodism to Bermuda. The first AME church in Bermuda was erected in 1885 in Hamilton Parish, on the shore of Harrington Sound, and titled St. John African Methodist Episcopal Church (the congregation had begun previously as part of the British Methodist Episcopal Church of Canada). Although the Church of England (since 1978, titled the Anglican Church of Bermuda) remains the largest denomination in Bermuda (15.8%), the AME quickly flourished (accounting for 8.6% of the population today), overtaking the Wesleyan Methodists (2.7% today).

Among other observations of coloured Bermudians, Lloyd also recorded:

Usage of the word "nigger" was generally avoided in Bermuda, where blacks and whites always lived in close quarters (and language was characterised by euphemisms), even by the most negrophobic whites, and, unlike the reclamation of the word by some blacks in the United States of America, it has not been adopted or made in any way acceptable today by Bermuda's blacks and remains the foulest and most unutterable racial slur.

Later writers generally agreed on the subject of Bermuda's politely mannered society, generally understood to be a requirement in a small, tightly knit community which could not afford to allow tempers to be frayed.

As Christiana Rounds wrote in Harper's Magazine (re-published in an advertising pamphlet by A.L Mellen, the Proprietor of the Hamilton Hotel in 1876):

H.C. Walsh wrote in the December 1890 issue of Lippincott's Monthly Magazine:

As Bermuda's maritime economy began to falter during the nineteenth century, Bermudians would turn some of the woodland over to growing export crops, but most of the farming (or gardening, as it is known in Bermuda) would be carried out by imported labour, beginning with immigration from Portuguese Atlantic islands in the 1840s. Later in the nineteenth century, large-scale West Indian immigration began (initially, also to provide labourers for the new export agriculture industry, then greatly increased at the turn of the century during the expansion of the Royal Naval Dockyard). The Black West Indians, unlike the Portuguese immigrants, were British citizens and not obliged to leave Bermuda, as many Portuguese were, at the end of a contracted period, although they were effectively indentured to the firm contracted by the Admiralty to carry out the construction work, and due to delays in construction, many found themselves in financial hardship.

In the latter twentieth century, those with any degree of sub-Saharan African ancestry (which was virtually everyone who had been defined as coloured) were redefined as Black, with Asian and other non-White Bermudians defined by separate racial groups (although it also, in the 1960s, ceased to be the practice to record race on birth or other records). On Census returns, only in recent years have Bermudians been given the option to define themselves by more than one race (the 2000 Census gave respondents the options of black, white, Asian, black and white, black and other, white and other, other, and not stated), although there was considerable opposition to this from many Black leaders who discouraged Black Bermudians from doing so.

In the U.S., there is similar resistance from minority groups to defining themselves by more than one race on census returns, or as multi-racial, as it is feared that this will fragment demographic groups, and lower the percentage of the population recorded as belonging to a particular race, with possible negative effects on government policies (such as affirmative action) aimed at addressing the concerns of disadvantaged minority groups. As Bermuda's Blacks (whether perceived as a diverse, multi-racial group or as homogeneously Black African) have been in the majority for two centuries, but are still comparatively less well-off than White Bermudians (the Government of Bermuda's 2009 employment survey showed the median annual income for blacks for the year 2007-8 was $50,539, and for whites was $71,607, with white Bermudian clerks earning $8,000 a year more than black Bermudian clerks, and black Bermudian senior officials and managers earning $73,242 compared to $91,846 for white Bermudian senior officials and managers; the racial disparity was also observed among expatriate workers, with white non-Bermudian senior officials and managers earning $47,000 more than black non-Bermudian senior officials and managers), this fear may presumably also be the cause for the opposition to census reform in Bermuda. Large-scale West Indian immigration over the last century has also decreased the ratio of Black Bermudians who are multi-racial, and hardened attitudes. Most academic books on the subject emphasise the characteristic multi-racialism of Bermuda's Black population  (at least those who might be defined as ethnically Bermudian, as opposed to those resulting from recent immigration), and it has been pointed out in other publications  that, if those Black Bermudians who have White ancestry were numbered instead with the White population, the Black population of Bermuda would be negligible.

This overlooks the resentment felt by most Black Bermudians over a history of racial repression, segregation, discrimination and marginalisation that continued long after slavery, and that did not distinguish between black and bi/multi-racial Bermudians. With the increasingly racially divisive politics that have followed the election of the PLP government, as well as the decades of increasing costs-of-living, the exclusion of unskilled workers from jobs in the white collar international business sector that has come to dominate Bermuda's economy, and the global economic downturn, all of which many Black Bermudians perceive as hitting them hardest, there is little sentiment today amongst people who have long been obliged to think of themselves as Black, in opposition to being White, to identify even partly with their European ancestry. Additionally, most multi-racial Bermudians do not today result from having parents of different races, but inherit diverse ancestry via many generations of mixed-race forebears, most of whom may have assumed themselves to have been entirely of Black African ancestry, and certainly were generally characterised as such by whites (and hence by the mainstream culture). The Progressive Labour Party, the first party formed in 1963 before party politics was legalised, quickly came to be dominated by West Indians and West Indian Bermudians such as Lois Browne-Evans, and is still derided by many white and blacks Bermudians as promoting racially divisive, black nationalist "plantation politics" (a term with double meaning in traditionally sea-faring Bermuda where there remains a strong stigma against agricultural work).

Bermudian blacks were generally antagonistic to West Indian, who, like the early Portuguese immigrants, were perceived as driving down the cost of labour, primarily to the disadvantage of Bermudian blacks, and in recent decades (Jamaicans especially) have often been blamed for the illegal drug trade and violent crimes, including the 1996 murder of Rebecca Middleton.

Bermudian blacks described black West Indians disparagingly as "Jump-ups", and were in turn perceived by many West Indian blacks as what in the United States are described as Uncle Toms, although more derogatory terms have been used for Bermudian blacks who oppose the party's agenda, especially on independence from the United Kingdom. Consequently, the party long struggled to unite Bermudian blacks with West Indian Bermudians under a banner of racial solidarity against white Bermudians to whom Bermudian blacks were tied by common heritage and blood, and did not win an election until 1998, after the United Bermuda Party (which PLP politicians characterised as the party for whites) was split by internal conflict following Premier John W. Swan's forcing an unpopular referendum on independence in 1995. The desire amongst black nationalists, and especially those of West Indian stock, to obscure the distinction between Bermudian blacks and West Indians by stressing black African heritage has also contributed to intolerance of Bermudian blacks identifying with their non-African, especially their white, ancestry.

Despite these concerns, small numbers of Black Bermudians have chosen to describe themselves on census returns as mixed-racial, and the Native American demographic, which had disappeared for centuries, is slowly re-emerging, as more Bermudians – especially on St. David's Island – choose to identify to some degree, if not exclusively, with their Native American ancestry (although many may feel that, in an increasingly polarised climate, this is a safer option than identifying themselves as in any way White or European).

Nonetheless, any assumption of Bermudian demographics that is based on census returns, or other sources derived from them, suffers from anecdotal evidence being the basis of all of the data, in asking Bermudians to self-identify, without resorting to any documentary evidence or genetic studies being used to confirm their ancestry, if not their identification. There is similar pressure on Black Bermudians (most of whom are multi-racial) not to self-identify as mixed race as there is in Blacks in the US, where President Barack Obama, raised by his single, white mother, sparked debate when he identified himself on the census as black, rather than mixed race, and in the UK, in both of which countries greater flexibility is also now allowed for people to describe themselves racially.

Portuguese immigration, from Atlantic islands including the Azores, Madeira and the Cape Verde Islands, began in the nineteenth century to provide labour for the nascent agricultural industry. From the beginning, Portuguese labourers, who have emigrated under special agreements, have not been allowed to do so on the basis of permanent immigration. They were expected to return to their homelands after a fixed period. Some were able to stay, however and by the 1940s there was a sizeable number Portuguese-Bermudians who were legally Bermudian (and British by citizenship). Until the recession of the 1990s, however, Bermuda continued to rely on large-scale immigration of temporary Portuguese workers who laboured at jobs Bermudians considered unworthy (notably, anything to do with agriculture or horticulture). Many of these immigrants lived and worked in Bermuda for decades on repeatedly renewed work permits, without gaining the right to permanent residence, British citizenship, or Bermudian status. When work permits were not renewed, especially during the recession, many were forced to return to the Azores, often with full-grown children who had been born and brought up in Bermuda. Although the numbers of Portuguese guest workers has not returned to its former levels, the number of Bermudians today described as Portuguese (often considered a distinct racial group from Whites of Northern European ancestry, and historically stigmatised by all other Bermudians) is usually given as ten percent of the population. This number does not include many Black Bermudians with White Portuguese ancestry, and obscures also that some of the Portuguese immigrants were Blacks from the Cape Verde Islands. The actual percentage of Bermudians with Portuguese ancestry is likely far larger.

Noting that Bermudians of Portuguese heritage have made considerable contributions to the Island – from politics and public service, to sport, entertainment and industry – Premier Edward David Burt announced that 4 November 2019 "will be declared a public holiday to mark the 170th anniversary of the arrival of the first Portuguese immigrants in Bermuda. Those first immigrants arrived from Madeira aboard the vessel the Golden Rule on 4th November 1849."

Source populations and genetic research

The founder population that settled in Bermuda between 1609 and the 1630s was almost entirely English. Typical Bermudian surnames that date to the seventeenth century indicate that the primary area of England from which settlers were sourced during that period was East Anglia and surrounding counties. Examples include Ingham, from Ingham, Lincolnshire, and Trimingham, from the village of Trimingham in Norfolk. This ancestry is shared, today, by both white and black Bermudians (the latter demographic group, as noted above, being made up of individuals of a blend of African, European and Native American ancestry, though not necessarily in that order). A continuous inward flow of immigrants from other parts of the British Isles, other British (or formerly British) territories, and foreign countries has added to the white population over the centuries, including sustained immigration from Portuguese Atlantic islands from the 1840s, and numerous Royal Navy and British Army personnel who were discharged and remained in Bermuda to contribute to the permanent population (white and multi-racial). The white population (that is, those Bermudians presumed to be entirely of European ancestry) has consequently grown more diverse. No genetic study has as yet been conducted either of or including the white population of Bermuda. Although European ancestry is the largest component of Bermuda's ancestry, and those entirely of European ancestry are by far the largest mono-racial group (based on actual ancestry, rather than self-identification), whites (and the European ancestry of blacks) are often excluded when Bermuda's source populations are discussed. By example, National Geographic's Genographic Project Reference Population (Geno 2.0 Next Generation) for "Bermudian" (as of 28 June 2020) was described on its website (which was taken offline after 30 June 2020) as "based on samples collected from mixed populations living in Bermuda" (this was not based on a survey of even the mixed, or other-than-entirely-European population, of Bermuda, as no such survey of all of Bermuda has been carried out).

In the British West Indian islands (and also in the southern continental colonies that were to become states of the United States of America), the majority of enslaved blacks brought across the Atlantic came from West Africa (roughly between modern Senegal and Ghana). By contrast, very little of Bermuda's original black emigration came (directly or indirectly) from this area. The first blacks to arrive in Bermuda in any numbers were free blacks who came in the mid-seventeenth century from Spanish-speaking areas of the West Indies, and most of the remainder were recently enslaved Africans captured from the Spanish. Spain was little involved in the trans-atlantic slave trade, instead purchasing enslaved Africans from the Portuguese and Arab slave traders. The Portuguese sourced most of their slaves from South-West Africa, through ports in modern-day Angola; and the Arabs' slave trading was centred in Zanzibar, in South-East Africa.

This history has been well understood from the written record, and was confirmed in 2009 by the only genetic survey of Bermuda, which looked exclusively at the black population of St. David's Island (as the purpose of the study was to seek Native American haplogroups, which could be assumed to be absent from the white population) consequently showed that the African ancestry of black Bermudians (other than those resulting from recent immigration from the British West Indian islands) is largely from a band across southern Africa, from Angola to Mozambique, which is similar to what is revealed in Latin America, but distinctly different from the blacks of the British West Indies and the United States.

68% of the mtDNA (maternal) lineages of the black islanders were found to be African, with the two most common being L0a and L3e, which are sourced from populations spread from Central-West to South-East Africa. These lineages represent less than 5% of the mtDNA lineages of blacks in the United States and the English-speaking West Indies. They are, however, common in Brazil and the Spanish-speaking countries of Latin America. L3e, by example, is typical of !Kung-speaking populations of the Kalahari, as well as of parts of Mozambique and Nigeria. The modern nation where it represents the highest percentage of the population is actually Brazil, where it represents 21% of mtDNA lineages. 31% of the mtDNA lineages of blacks in Bermuda are West Eurasian (European), with J1c being the most common. 1% were Native American.

For NRY (paternal) haplogroups among black Bermudians, the study found about a third were made up of three African ones (of which E1b1a, the most common NRY haplogroup in West and Central African populations, "accounted for the vast majority of the African NRY samples (83%)" ), with the remainder (about 64.79%) being West Eurasian excepting one individual (1.88%) with a Native American NRY haplogroup Q1a3a. Of the individuals with European NRY haplogroups, more than half had R1b1b2, which is common in Europe and is found at frequencies over 75% in England and Wales. None of these percentages can be taken as equivalent to the percentage of ancestry in the black population from the specific regions as genetic drift tends to erase minority haplogroups over generations. This explains the near absence of Native American haplogroups despite the hundreds of Native Americans known to have been involuntarily brought to Bermuda in the seventeenth century.

Population

According to the 2016 census the de jure population was 63,779, compared to 64,319 in 2010 and 62,098 in 2000.

Languages
The predominant language on Bermuda is Bermudian English. It exhibits characteristics of British, West Indian, and American English. Perhaps most interesting is its closeness to acrolectal English compared to varieties in the West Indies.

British English spellings and conventions are used in print media and formal written communications.

Portuguese is also spoken in Bermuda; this is owing to immigration from Portugal, particularly from the Azores, as well as from Madeira and the Cape Verde Islands.

Vital statistics

Structure of the population
Structure of the population (2016 Census):

Ethnic groups

As noted above, only in recent years have Bermudians been given the option to define themselves by more than one race on census returns (and birth registrations), with the 2000 Census giving respondents the options of black, white, Asian, black and white, black and other, white and other, other, and not stated. For a variety of reasons, most Bermudians have continued to identify themselves by a single racial group.

One race
The 2016 Census results reported roughly 91% of the population self-identifying as only one racial group which was slightly lower than the 2010 Census. The largest group reported Black alone, which decreased slightly from 54% in 2010 to 52% in 2016. The White population remained constant at about 31% of the total population in 2016. The remaining 8% of the 2016 population who reported one race consisted of persons reporting Asian only (4%), and those reporting an other race from the ones listed (4%). The proportions of these respective racial groups were similar to what they were in 2010.

More than one race

Nine percent of the population reported belonging to more than one race in 2016, up from 8% in 2010. The black and white category was the most common, representing 39% of the number reporting multi-racial groups and 4% of the total population of Bermuda. The proportion of 'black and other' increased from 2% to 3% of the total population, making up 35% of the people identifying as mixed race. The remainder were of 'white and other' mixed descent, and remained unchanged at 2% of the total population. The changing racial composition of Bermuda's population is consequence of immigration and an increase of persons acknowledging mixed racial heritage.

Religion

During the intercensal period, the distribution of persons across the various religious affiliations shifted but remained generally widespread. All religious groups experienced declines in their followings with the exception of Roman Catholics, Seventh-Day Adventists and non-denominational groups. Nearly one fifth or 20% of the population claimed no religious affiliation in 2010 compared with a 14% share in 2000. Although the number of Roman Catholics increased to 9,340 persons, its share remained constant at 15% compared to 2000. Over the ten-year period, nondenominational congregations increased a strong 33% while the Seventh-Day Adventist following rose 6%.

See also
 Bermuda

References

 
Society of Bermuda